Abgar VII was king of Osrhoene from . His primary goal was to remain independent of both the major powers in the region, the Roman and the Parthian Empires. The Roman general Lusius Quietus responded promptly by capturing and sacking Edessa. Abgar VII died at this time.

Sources do not agree on what happened after Abgar VII's death.

Citations

References 

 
 
 

Kings of Osroene
Year of birth missing
116 deaths
2nd-century Arabs